Natronospira is an extremely halotolerant and alkaliphilic genus of bacteria from the family of Ectothiorhodospiraceae with one known species (Natronospira proteinivora). Natronospira proteinivora has been isolated from hypersaline soda lakes from the Kulunda Steppe in Russia.

References

Chromatiales
Bacteria genera
Monotypic bacteria genera
Taxa described in 2017